Mineral water containing different minerals, salts, biological active elements is popular from ancient times for its healing factor. Due to contained gases mineral water may be effervescent or "sparkling".

Overview 
There are more than 1000 unlimited mineral water resources in the Republic of Azerbaijan. Most of them are widespread over mountainous regions of the Republic.

Mineral waters of Absheron peninsula 
Absheron peninsula is famous not only for its beaches.  Containing iodine, bromine and other elements mineral waters of Absheron peninsula made it much more popular.  There are many healing springs in Surakhani, Mardakan,  Buzovna, Bilga, Pirshagi, Shikhov . Sanatoriums, rest homes were built in those areas.

Mineral waters of Nakhchivan AR 
Nakhchivan is called “Natural museum of mineral waters”. It is not accidentally. Very valuable mineral waters such as Sirab, Badamly, Vaykhir, Daridagh, Nahajir, Jahri, Deste, Gahab, etc. are widespread in Nakhchivan.

Sirab 
The source of this mineral water is in the mountains terrain.  There are three mineral water basins which differ from each other for their chemical compounds in Sirab (Kalbaaghil, Shorsudara and Kutandagh.). Sirab contains iron, bromine, lithium, strontium and other useful chemical elements. It is useful in the treatment of gastro-intestinal, liver, kidney, urinary and other diseases, as well helps  breathing, correct rhythm of heart muscles, the normalization of metabolism, and activation of blood pressure.

The source of Badamli mineral water  is situated at 1274 meter over the sea level. This spring was discovered in the middle of the last century. During 1945-1947 geologist Dr. Aziz Azgerov made important scientific investigations in the territory to investigate Badamly mineral water.

Vaykhir is situated at 17 km distance from the city of Nakhchivan (1400m above the sea level). This mineral water contains carbonated, chloride-hydrocarbonated-natrium. Vaykhir mineral water helps gastroenteric diseases, chronic gastritis, metabolism disturbance (sugar diabet, gastritis, diathesis, ocsalanturium) illness.

Mineral waters of Nagorno Karabakh

Mineral waters of Lachin-Kalbajar 
Treatment zones with mineral waters in the Kalbajar district of Azerbaijan such as Yukhari Istisu, Ashagi Istisu, Keshdek, Garasu, Mozchay, Bagirsag, Gotorsu are famous in the Caucasus. Istisu  can be compared to the famous therapeutic warm sulfur springs of the famous Karlovy Vary resort in the Czech Republic.Utilization reserve of Yukhari Istisu waters deposit was confirmed in the amount of 82 thousand liters per day. Reserve of Ashagi Istisu was confirmed in the amount of 260 thousand liters, 70 thousand liters in Qoturlu, 600 thousand liters in Tutgun.

Mineral waters of Ganja

Mineral waters of Shamakhi

Mineral waters of Sheki-Zagatala

Mineral waters of Lankaran

See also 
 Istisu resort

References

External links 
İlisu ensiklopedik məlumat kitabı.2005.s.73.
• Азəрбаjчан ССР-нын АТЛАСЫ.Бакы-Москва.1963.səh.36-37 
• Вейденбаум Н.Г.Путеводител по Кавказа.-Тифлис,1888.с.392. 
• http://www.azerbaijan.az/portal/Nature/Geostructure/geostructure_03_e.html?
• http://www.ilisu-uludag.com/?lang=1&id=9

Azerbaijan